David Waxman is a DJ, remixer and producer.

Career
Waxman made his professional debut at the Roxy in 1992. He has been resident DJ at numerous world-renowned clubs such as Liquid, Miami (1996–1998), Twilo, NY (1998–2000), and Crobar Chicago, Miami, NY (2002–2005). He became widely known for bootleg remixes of hits such as Beck's "New Pollution," Queen's "Another One Bites the Dust," Nine Inch Nails' "Closer to God," and AC/DC's "Dirty Deeds" among other worldwide smashes. In addition, he recorded under the moniker of Afrowax the 1997 club/dance hit "English 101 (Can You Understand English?)". In addition to his artistic career, Waxman currently holds the position of General Manager at Ultra Records.

Discography

Albums
2001: Welcome to New York

Mixed compilations
2001: Ultra.Chilled 01
2002: Ultra.Chilled 02
2002: Ultra.80's vs Electro
2002: Ultra.Chilled 03
2002: Ultra.Trance:1
2003: Ministry of Sound: American Anthems
2003: Ministry of Sound: The Annual 2004
2003: Club Nation 2002, Vol. 2
2003: Ultra.Chilled 042003: Ultra.Club Classics: '90s2003: Ultra.Trance:22004: Ultra.Dance 052004: Ministry of Sound: The Annual 20052005: Ministry of Sound: The Annual 20062005: Ultra.Chilled 052005: Ultra.Weekend2006: Ultra Electro2007: Ultra Electro 22007: Ultra.102008: Ultra.Dance 092009: Just Dance2009: Ultra Hits - #75 The Billboard 200
2009: Ultra Electro 32009: Just Dance 2''

Singles/EPs

as Afrowax
1997: "English 101 (Can You Understand English?)"
1997: "What is Your Problem?"
1998: "Do You Want More?"

as David Waxman
2009: "Can You Understand English?"
2010: "Flood (Lift Me Up)"

Selected remixes
"I Want Your Soul" - Armand Van Helden
"New Pollution" - Beck
"Moving Into Light" - Black Fras
"We Got the Beats" - Go Go Boy
"Yeah... Right" - Jonah
"Beachball" - Nalin & Kane
"Closer to God" - Nine Inch Nails
"All I Know" - Orielle
"Another One Bites the Dust" - Queen

References

External links

American electronic musicians
American house musicians
Club DJs
American DJs
Living people
Remixers
Nightlife in New York City
Year of birth missing (living people)
Electronic dance music DJs